William Edward Norris (18 November 18471925) was a London-born English fiction and writer. His first story, Heap of Money, appeared in 1877, and was followed by a long series of novels and stories, many of which first appeared in the Temple Bar and Cornhill magazines.

Life
William Edward Norris was born in London, the son of Sir William Norris, Chief Justice of Ceylon. He was educated at Eton, and called to the bar at the Inner Temple in 1874, though he never practised law. 

Norris died on 20 November 1925 at his Torquay home.

Works
Norris wrote over 60 novels; the Encyclopædia Britannica, 11th (ed), published in 1911, listed the following as his best to that date: Mademoiselle de Mersac (1880), Matrimony (1881), No New Thing (1883), My Friend Jim (1886), The Rogue (1888), The Despotic Lady (1895), Mathew Austin (1895), The Widower (1898), Nature's Comedian (1904) and Pauline (1908).

Novels

Short story collections

Short Stories in magazines, newspapers and anthologies

References

External links

Works by William Edward Norris at Google Books

1847 births
1925 deaths
People educated at Eton College
19th-century English novelists
20th-century English novelists
English short story writers
English male short story writers
English male novelists
19th-century British short story writers
19th-century English male writers
20th-century British short story writers
20th-century English male writers